Anchalik Gana Morcha is an regional Indian political party, launched in June 2020 in Assam. It is led by former Rajya Sabha MP Ajit Kumar Bhuyan. It is part of the United Progressive Alliance (UPA) and contested the 2021 Assam Legislative Assembly election as a part of the Mahajot (Grand Alliance) under the leadership of the Indian National Congress (INC). It is the only party from opposition to have a seat in Rajya Sabha from Assam.

References

2020 establishments in India
Political parties established in 2020
State political parties in Assam